Andrew Tracey (born 5 May 1936, Durban, South Africa) is a South African ethnomusicologist, promoter of African music, composer, folk singer, band leader, and actor. His father, Hugh Tracey (1903–1977), pioneered the study of traditional African music in the 1920s–1970s, created the International Library of African Music (ILAM) in 1954, and started the company African Musical Instruments (AMI) which manufactured the first commercial kalimbas in the 1950s.

Tracey continued and complemented the work of his father in a variety of ways. With brother Paul, he co-wrote and performed in the world musical revue Wait a Minim! which travelled around the world for seven years. With his father and brother, Tracey wrote the first instructional materials for the Hugh Tracey kalimbas which were being sent around the world in the 1960s. Upon his father's death in 1977, Tracey took over his father's role as director of ILAM, which he filled until his retirement in 2005, and his wife Heather took over the role of director of AMI until 1999.

Upbringing 

Tracey was exposed to African music from an early age as he observed his father's research on Chopi xylophone music at the family home in Durban. He attended the traditional African dance performances his father arranged on Sunday afternoons for the dock workers, and listened to his father's radio broadcasts which featured traditional African stories and African music. As Hugh Tracey became more devoted to his work on African music, his marriage frayed, and his wife Ursula Campbell Tracey (1910–1987) moved to England with sons Paul and Andrew. Andrew went to Oxford University where he studied anthropology, languages and, informally, folk music. He was especially intrigued by calypso and Brazilian music – rhythmic world music with strong African roots.

Return to Africa 

Tracey returned to Africa, first in the British military, but then later came to South Africa to join brother Paul and his father at "The Farm", the property in Krugersdorp outside of Johannesburg where Hugh Tracey started ILAM and AMI. While Paul oversaw the production of kalimbas at AMI, Andrew began working with his father, seeking to understand and document the musics of south eastern Africa.

The spiritual center of the African lamellophone world is Zimbabwe. The instrument that Hugh Tracey had fallen in love with when he arrived in Africa in the 1920s was the mbira, a complex 24-note lamellophone used by the Shona people of Zimbabwe. It was a natural homage to this and other related instruments when Hugh and Andrew Tracey helped Robert Sibson found the Kwanongoma College of African Music (now United College of Music), in Bulawayo, Rhodesia (now Zimbabwe), in 1960. Part of Andrew's job in building Kwanongoma was to scout around in the townships for players of traditional instruments who could come and teach at the new college. His big find was Jege Tapera, who played the mbira nyunga nyunga, also known as the karimba. This was the first experience Andrew had learning from a traditional player of African music. Without any formal training in ethnomusicology, Tracey wrote several papers on African music for the Journal of African Music, the publication his father started as a means of disseminating the results of research at ILAM and other institutions about Africa and the world. One of Andrew's early papers was a description of the mbira music of Jege Tapera.

Wait a Minim! 

Starting in 1961, Tracey co-wrote, with Jeremy Taylor and his brother Paul, the songs for two musical reviews that played in Johanesberg and in Rhodesia. After combining the best material into a single musical review, Wait a Minim!, they had a hit on their hands, and they performed in Wait a Minim! between 1962 and 1968 in South Africa, Rhodesia, England, United States, Canada, New Zealand and Australia, including 461 shows spanning more than a year on Broadway in New York. With over 50 instruments in the show, many of them African, Tracey helped educate the world about unique African instruments, including the kalimba. He appeared on The Tonight Show with Johnny Carson a number of times. This performance career put his ethnomusicology research on hold.

Ethnomusicology 

When Tracey returned to Africa in 1969, he quickly got back to his research on African music, carrying on as an associate at ILAM under his father. His field research centred on Zimbabwe, Mozambique, Malawi, Zambia, Uganda, South Africa, and Namibia, focused on the playing technique of members of the mbira and xylophone families. A highlight of Tracey's research was the identification of the lower course of tines on the karimba (i.e., Jege Tapera's mbira nyunga nyunga) as the logical ancestor of essentially all mbiras. Those eight notes can be traced through every mbira and karimba played in the Zambezi Valley, and those eight notes form the core of all kalimba music in that region, which is considered to be the birthplace of the metal-tined kalimba about 1300 years ago. Tracey asserts that the first written account of the kalimba by Portuguese missionary Father Dos Santos, in Mozambique in 1589, was in essence these eight notes. Other instruments, such as the mbira, or the modern karimba (mbira nyunga nyunga), are based on those eight notes, with other notes and other courses of notes having been added over the centuries. While it is impossible to say when those eight notes first started appearing in kalimbas, Tracey's work convinces that the note layout of the karimba is truly ancient and gave rise to all other kalimbas in the region.

In the 1980s Tracey made a design for a 17-note karimba, based on Tapera's 15-note instrument, using the same hardware as the Hugh Tracey treble kalimba, and AMI began selling it as the African Tuned Karimba.

While Tracey's seven-year stint performing in a Broadway musical did not leave any time for ethnomusicological research, his studies at ILAM did allow him to perform. When he returned to Africa in 1969, he started the Andrew Tracey Steel Pan Band, which performed around Grahamstown and South Africa and in festivals such as the National Arts Festival in Grahamstown until 2007.

Director of ILAM 

When father Hugh died in 1977, Tracey took over his job and became Director of ILAM and editor of the Journal of African Music, roles he filed until his retirement in 2005. His wife Heather took over African Musical Instruments (AMI), the maker of the Hugh Tracey Kalimbas. In 1977, apartheid South Africa was seen internationally as a pariah state, and funding for ILAM dried up. Tracey was able to arrange support for ILAM from Rhodes University in Grahamstown, South Africa, which resulted in both ILAM and AMI moving from Krugersdorp to Grahamstown.

During the 28 years Tracey headed ILAM, he lectured on African music at universities in South Africa, Zimbabwe, United States, Germany, Portugal, for various schools and societies, TV, & radio. He received his own honorary doctorate in ethnomusicology from the University of Natal in Durban in 1995. David Dargie, a Catholic priest, trained in ethnomusicology under Andrew and obtained a doctorate from Rhodes University in 1986. Dargie used this training to help the Xhosa people of South Africa take pride in their own traditional music, and he pushed to include traditional African music in Catholic masses.

Tracey retired from ILAM in 2005, but still lives in Grahamstown, South Africa, where he is a well-respected and active member of the community.

Karimba music

Selected publications 

 The 1973 Mgodo wa Mbanguzi and Mgodo wa Mkandeni, two complete performances of traditional music for 'timbila' xylophone orchestra and dance in two Chopi villages in southern Mozambique. Produced by Gei Zantzinger and Andrew Tracey.
 Tracey, Andrew. (1970). How to play the mbira (dza vadzimu). Roodepoort, Transvaal, South Africa: International Library of African Music.

See also 

 Music of Africa
 Music of Zimbabwe
 Music of Mozambique
 Gravikord

References

External links 

 International Library of African Music (ILAM)
 African Musical Instruments (AMI)
 Kalimba Magic's interview with Andrew Tracey

Academic staff of Rhodes University
South African musicologists
Living people
1936 births
Alumni of the University of Oxford
Rhodes University alumni